Dagsboro may refer to:

 Dagsboro, Delaware
 Dagsboro Hundred, an unincorporated subdivision of Sussex County, Delaware; see List of Delaware Hundreds.